Massimo Guglielmi (born 10 January 1970) is an Italian lightweight rower. He won a gold medal at the 1990 World Rowing Championships in Tasmania with the lightweight men's quadruple scull.

References

1970 births
Living people
Italian male rowers
World Rowing Championships medalists for Italy
Rowers of Fiamme Oro